Lithium metal batteries are primary batteries that have metallic lithium as an anode. These types of batteries are also referred to as lithium-metal batteries after lithium-ion batteries had been invented. Most lithium metal batteries are non-rechargeable. However, rechargeable lithium metal batteries are also under development. Since 2007, Dangerous Goods Regulations differentiate between lithium metal batteries (UN 3090) and lithium-ion batteries (UN 3480).

They stand apart from other batteries in their high charge density and high cost per unit.

Disposable primary lithium batteries must be distinguished from secondary lithium-ion or a lithium-polymer, which are rechargeable batteries and contain no metallic lithium. Lithium is especially useful, because its ions can be arranged to move between the anode and the cathode, using an intercalated lithium compound as the cathode material but without using lithium metal as the anode material. Pure lithium will instantly react with water, or even moisture in the air;  the lithium in lithium-ion batteries is a less reactive compound.

Lithium batteries are widely used in portable consumer electronic devices. The term "lithium battery" refers to a family of different lithium-metal chemistries, comprising many types of cathodes and electrolytes but all with metallic lithium as the anode. The battery requires from 0.15 to 0.3 kg of lithium per kWh. As designed these primary systems use a charged cathode, that being an electro-active material with crystallographic vacancies that are filled gradually during discharge.

The most common type of lithium cell used in consumer applications uses metallic lithium as the anode and manganese dioxide as the cathode, with a salt of lithium dissolved in an organic solvent as the electrolyte.

History

Chemistries 

University of California San Diego have developed an electrolyte chemistry that allows lithium batteries to run at temperatures as low as -60 °C. The electrolytes also enable electrochemical capacitors to run as low as -80 °C. Previous low-temperature limit is -40 °C. High performance at room temperature is still maintained. This may improve energy density and safety of lithium batteries and electrochemical capacitors.

Applications
Lithium batteries find application in many long-life, critical devices, such as pacemakers and other implantable electronic medical devices. These devices use specialized lithium-iodide batteries designed to last 15 or more years. But for other, less critical applications such as in toys, the lithium battery may actually outlast the device. In such cases, an expensive lithium battery may not be cost-effective.

Lithium batteries can be used in place of ordinary alkaline cells in many devices, such as clocks and cameras. Although they are more costly, lithium cells will provide much longer life, thereby minimizing battery replacement. However, attention must be given to the higher voltage developed by the lithium cells before using them as a drop-in replacement in devices that normally use ordinary zinc cells.

Lithium batteries also prove valuable in oceanographic applications. While lithium battery packs are considerably more expensive than standard oceanographic packs, they hold up to three times the capacity of alkaline packs. The high cost of servicing remote oceanographic instrumentation (usually by ships) often justifies this higher cost.

Sizes and formats
 
Small lithium batteries are very commonly used in small, portable electronic devices, such as PDAs, watches, camcorders, digital cameras, thermometers, calculators, personal computer BIOS (firmware), communication equipment and remote car locks. They are available in many shapes and sizes, with a common variety being the 3-volt "coin" type manganese variety. The common CR2032 battery is 20 mm diameter and 3.2 mm thick, where the first two digits is the diameter and the last two digits are thickness. A CR2025 is the same 20 mm diameter but 2.5 mm thick.
 
The heavy electrical demands of many of these devices make lithium batteries a particularly attractive option. In particular, lithium batteries can easily support the brief, heavy current demands of devices such as digital cameras, and they maintain a higher voltage for a longer period than alkaline cells.

Popularity
Lithium primary batteries account for 28% of all primary battery sales in Japan but only 1% of all battery sales in Switzerland. In the EU only 0.5% of all battery sales including secondary types are lithium primaries.

Safety issues and regulation
The computer industry's drive to increase battery capacity can test the limits of sensitive components such as the membrane separator, a polyethylene or polypropylene film that is only 20–25 μm thick. The energy density of lithium batteries has more than doubled since they were introduced in 1991. When the battery is made to contain more material, the separator can undergo stress.

Rapid-discharge problems

Lithium batteries can provide extremely high currents and can discharge very rapidly when short-circuited. Although this is useful in applications where high currents are required, a too-rapid discharge of a lithium battery - especially if cobalt is present in the cells' design - can result in overheating of the battery (that lowers the electrical resistance of any cobalt content within the cell), rupture, and even an explosion. Lithium-thionyl chloride batteries are particularly susceptible to this type of discharge.  Consumer batteries usually incorporate overcurrent or thermal protection or vents to prevent an explosion.

Air travel

From January 1 2013, much stricter regulations were introduced by IATA regarding the carriage of lithium batteries by air. They were adopted by the International Postal Union; however, some countries, e.g. the UK, have decided that they will not accept lithium batteries unless they are included with the equipment they power.

Because of the above risks, shipping and carriage of lithium batteries are restricted in some situations, particularly the transport of lithium batteries by air.

The United States Transportation Security Administration announced restrictions effective January 1, 2008, on lithium batteries in checked and carry-on luggage. The rules forbid lithium batteries not installed in a device from checked luggage and restrict them in carry-on luggage by total lithium content.

Australia Post prohibited transport of lithium batteries in air mail during 2010.

UK regulations for the transport of lithium batteries were amended by the National Chemical Emergency Centre in 2009.

In late 2009, at least some postal administrations restricted airmail shipping (including Express Mail Service) of lithium batteries, lithium-ion batteries and products containing these (such as laptops and cell phones). Among these countries are Hong Kong, United States, and Japan.

Methamphetamine labs
Unused lithium batteries provide a convenient source of lithium metal for use as a reducing agent in methamphetamine labs. Specifically, lithium metal reduces pseudoephedrine and ephedrine to methamphetamine in the Birch reduction method, which employs solutions of alkali metals dissolved in anhydrous ammonia.

Some jurisdictions have passed laws to restrict lithium battery sales or asked businesses to make voluntary restrictions in an attempt to help curb the creation of illegal meth labs. In 2004 Wal-Mart stores were reported to limit the sale of disposable lithium batteries to three packages in Missouri and four packages in other states.

Health issues on ingestion
Button cell batteries are attractive to small children and are often ingested. In the past 20 years, although there has not been an increase in the total number of button cell batteries ingested in a year, researchers have noted a 6.7-fold increase in the risk that an ingestion would result in a moderate or major complication and 12.5-fold increase in fatalities comparing the last decade to the previous one.
The primary mechanism of injury with button battery ingestions is the generation of hydroxide ions, which cause severe chemical burns, at the anode. This is an electrochemical effect of the intact battery, and does not require the casing to be breached or the contents released. Complications include oesophageal strictures, tracheo-oesophageal fistulas, vocal cord paralysis, aorto-oesophageal fistulas, and death. The majority of ingestions are not witnessed; presentations are non-specific; battery voltage has increased; the 20 to 25 mm button battery size are more likely to become lodged at the cricopharyngeal junction; and severe tissue damage can occur within 2 hours. The 3 V, 20 mm CR2032 lithium battery has been implicated in many of the complications from button battery ingestions by children of less than 4 years of age.

While the only cure for an esophageal impaction is endoscopic removal, a 2018 study out of Children's Hospital of Philadelphia by Rachel R. Anfang and colleagues found that early and frequent ingestion of honey or sucralfate suspension prior to the battery's removal can reduce the injury severity to a significant degree. As a result, US-based National Capital Poison Center (Poison Control) recommends the use of honey or sucralfate after known or suspected ingestions to reduce the risk and severity of injury to esophagus, and consequently its nearby structures.

Button batteries can also cause significant necrotic injury when stuck in the nose or ears. Prevention efforts in the US by the National Button Battery Task force in cooperation with industry leaders have led to changes in packaging and battery compartment design in electronic devices to reduce a child's access to these batteries. However, there still is a lack of awareness across the general population and medical community to its dangers. Central Manchester University Hospital Trust warns that "a lot of doctors are unaware that this can cause harm".

Disposal

Regulations for disposal and recycling of batteries vary widely; local governments may have additional requirements over those of national regulations. In the United States, one manufacturer of lithium iron disulfide primary batteries advises that consumer quantities of used cells may be discarded in municipal waste, as the battery does not contain any substances controlled by US Federal regulations.

Another manufacturer states that "button" size lithium batteries contain perchlorate, which is regulated as a hazardous waste in California; regulated quantities would not be found in typical consumer use of these cells.

As lithium in used but non-working (i.e. extended storage) button cells is still likely to be in the cathode cup, it is possible to extract commercially useful quantities of the metal from such cells as well as the manganese dioxide and specialist plastics. Some also alloy the lithium with magnesium (Mg) to cut costs and these are particularly prone to the mentioned failure mode.

Rechargeable batteries

See also

List of battery types
List of battery sizes
Comparison of battery types
Battery holder
Battery recycling
High capacity oceanographic lithium battery pack
Lithium–air battery
Lithium ion manganese oxide battery
Lithium ion polymer battery
Lithium iron phosphate battery
Lithium–sulfur battery
Lithium-titanate battery
Nanoarchitectures for lithium-ion batteries
Polyoxyethylene
Thin film rechargeable lithium battery

References

External links

 The 2009 amendments to the regulations regarding transport of Lithium Batteries
 Properties of non-rechargeable lithium batteries
 Brand Neutral Drawings of Lithium Batteries based on ANSI Specifications
 Lithium Thionyl Chloride Battery MSDS and supporting safety information
 Investigation of the fire performance of lithium-ion- and lithium-metal-batteries in various applications and derivative of tactical recommendations (Research Report in German, Forschungsstelle für Brandschutztechnik, Karlsruhe Institute of Technology - KIT) (PDF)
 

Battery (electricity)
Disposable batteries
Canadian inventions
Lithium